is a Japanese television jidaigeki or period drama that was broadcast on NHK in 1985–1986. It is based on Shōtarō Ikenami's novel Sanada Taiheiki. The drama focuses on the history of the Sanada clan during the late Sengoku period. The complete DVD box is available.

Plot 

In 1582, Oda and Tokugawa allied forces started an invasion of Takeda`s Kai Province. so Takeda clan was in danger of extinction. Sanada Masayuki advised Takeda Katsuyori to abandon Kai Province and flee towards Masayuki`s Iwabitsu Castle. Katsuyori accepted his suggestion once but he changed his mind and tried to flee towards Oyamada Nobushige`s Iwadono Castle but was betrayed by Oyamada Nobushige and killed himself at Tenmokuzan. Lost the lord, the Sanada clan unexpectedly became a small daimyo. The Sanada clan seeks the way to survive.

Production
Sword fight arranger - Kunishirō Hayashi

Cast

Sanada Clan
Tsunehiko Watase as Sanada Nobuyuki 
Masao Kusakari  as Sanada Nobushige (Yukimura)
Tetsuro Tamba as Sanada Masayuki
Takaaki Enoki as Higuchi Kakubei
Isao Natsuyagi as Tsubuya Matagorō
Haruka Kurara as Oko
Yoshi Katō as Yazawa Yoritsuna
Akiko Koyama as Yamanote Dono
Ryo Kinomoto as Mukai Saheiji
Misako Konno as Komatsuhime
Kumi Nakamura as Chikurin-in
Kataoka Takatarō as Sanada Daisuke

Uesugi Clan
Takao Itō as Uesugi Kagekatsu
Makoto Shimotsuka as Naoe Kanetsugu

Tokugawa Clan
Nakamura Umenosuke IV as Tokugawa Ieyasu
Nakamura Baijaku II as Tokugawa Hidetada
Takeshi Katō as Honda Tadakatsu
Junpei Morita as Honda Tadamasa
Akio Tanaka as Honda Masanobu
Kantarō Suga as Ii Naomasa
Rokko Toura as Ninja Nakayama Nagatoshi
Kyosuke Machida as Ninja Ban Naganobu

Toyotomi Clan
Hiroyuki Nagato as Toyotomi Hideyoshi
Hiroshi Tsuburaya as Toyotomi Hideyori
Masami Horiuchi as Toyotomi Hidetsugu
Keiko Tsushima as Kōdai-in
Mariko Okada as Yodo-dono
Youki Kudoh as Senhime
Kōji Shimizu as Ishida Mitsunari
Makoto Yuasa as Shima Sakon
Toshiyuki Hosokawa as Ōno Harunaga
Kōichi Yamamoto as Katagiri Katsumoto
Toshio Takahara as Nagai
Yōsuke Kondō as Gotō Mototsugu
Hiroshi Miyauchi as Mōri Katsunaga
Koreharu Hisatomi as Chōsokabe Morichika

Takeda Clan
Akiar Hiroshige Takeda Katsuyori
Yūsuke Tozawa as Oyamada Nobushige

Later Hōjō clan
Shōzō Fukuyama as Hōjō Ujimasa
Jinya Satō as Hōjō Ujinao

Maeda Clan
Shinsuke Mikimoto as Maeda Toshiie
Hiroko Kōda as Maeda Matsu
Hisayuki Nakajima as Maeda Toshinaga

The Eastern Army
Raita Ryu as Katō Kiyomasa
Nobuyuki Katsube as Fukushima Masanori
Hirotarō Honda as Asano Yoshinaga

The Western Army
Kunio Murai as Ōtani Yoshitsugu
Akira Ishihama as Ukita Hideie
Takahide Tashiro as Kobayakawa Hideaki
Shōji Nakayama as Mōri Terumoto

Others 

 Keiko Takeshita as Ono no Otsu
 Chiyonosuke Azuma as Yagyū Munetoshi

References

External links
 Sanada Taiheiki  - NHK) NHK　Archives

NHK television dramas
1985 Japanese television series debuts
Jidaigeki television series
1980s drama television series
Television shows based on Japanese novels
Cultural depictions of Toyotomi Hideyoshi
Cultural depictions of Tokugawa Ieyasu
Cultural depictions of Sanada clan
Television series set in the 16th century
Television series set in the 17th century